Budětice is a municipality and village in Klatovy District in the Plzeň Region of the Czech Republic. It has about 300 inhabitants.

Administrative parts
Villages of Lipová Lhota and Vlkonice are administrative parts of Budětice.

Gallery

References

Villages in Klatovy District